Marcos Juárez is a city in the province of Córdoba, Argentina. It is located 267 km southeast from the provincial capital Córdoba, on National Route 9, near the provincial boundary with Santa Fe

The city was the site of the 1983 World Five-pin Billiards Championship (won by Miguel Angel Borrelli of Argentina).

Climate

References

External links 
 Municipality of Marcos Juárez — Official website.
 City of Marcos Juárez — Portal of the city.
 
 Multimedios Creative Group — Official Project Manager. Official contact: Sr. Gustavo A. Biagiotti

Populated places in Córdoba Province, Argentina
Populated places established in 1887